Crowley's Ridge College is a private Christian college in Paragould, Arkansas. While the college is affiliated with the Churches of Christ, students of all religious backgrounds are welcome. The fall 2021 student population of 197 comprises both non-traditional and traditional residential and commuter students.

History
Crowley's Ridge College began in 1964. Its spiritual origins, if not its direct lineage, go back to two earlier institutions in the area, MONEA Christian College, in Rector, Arkansas, and Croft College, which was located in rural Greene County, Arkansas, both of which were defunct by the end of the 1930s.  The school achieved a major milestone in 2000 when it was formally accredited by the Higher Learning Commission and was included in membership in the North Central Association. After many years as the only two-year college in the United States affiliated with the Churches of Christ, Crowley’s Ridge College began transiting to become a four-year institution in 2007, when it received approval from the Arkansas Department of Higher Education to offer degrees at the baccalaureate level. In September 2008, the transition was completed when the Higher Learning Commission extended the college's accreditation to include the new degrees of Bachelor of Science in Business Administration and Bachelor of Arts in Biblical Studies.

In addition to three associate degree programs, the college now offers eleven degree programs at the baccalaureate level.

Location
The  campus is located atop the namesake geographic feature, Crowley's Ridge, one of the main terrain features of Eastern Arkansas.
The pine tree covered campus has a lake at the center of campus. There are eight buildings, containing , located on the college campus that is located on Highway 412 at the western city limits of Paragould, Arkansas.

Athletics
The Crowley's Ridge athletic teams are called the Pioneers. The college is a member of the National Association of Intercollegiate Athletics (NAIA), primarily competing as an NAIA Independent within the Continental Athletic Conference since the 2016–17 academic year. They were also a member of the National Christian College Athletic Association (NCCAA), primarily competing as an independent in the Central Region of the Division I level until after the 2015–16 school year.

Crowley's Ridge competes in eight intercollegiate varsity sports: Men's sports include baseball, basketball and golf; while women's sports include basketball, golf, softball and volleyball; and co-ed sports include jiu-jitsu (added in 2020). Former sports included co-ed cheerleading (added in 2019). Cross country for both men and women will be added in 2023.

See also 

 Crowley's Ridge Academy

References

External links
 
 Official athletics website

Universities and colleges affiliated with the Churches of Christ
Private universities and colleges in Arkansas
Educational institutions established in 1964
Buildings and structures in Paragould, Arkansas
Education in Greene County, Arkansas
1964 establishments in Arkansas